Marchánt Davis is an American actor. He is known for his performance in the 2019 film The Day Shall Come.  He also played a supporting role in the film Tuscaloosa (2019). He was nominated for a Lucille Lortel Award for his performance in Jordan E. Cooper's Ain't No Mo' at The Public Theater.

Early life and education 
Davis was born in Philadelphia.  He holds a Master of Fine Arts degree from New York University's Tisch School of the Arts.

Personal life 
Davis resides in New York City.

Filmography 
The Day Shall Come (2019)
Tuscaloosa (2019)
 A Journal for Jordan (2021)
 Reality (2023)

References

External links
 
 
 

Living people
Year of birth missing (living people)
21st-century American male actors
African-American male actors
American male film actors
American male stage actors
Male actors from New York City
Male actors from Philadelphia
Tisch School of the Arts alumni